The Allentown Symphony Orchestra is a major regional symphony orchestra based in Allentown, Pennsylvania.  Founded in 1951, the orchestra's current home is the historic, 1200-seat Miller Symphony Hall, located in downtown Allentown.  The orchestra has the distinction of being the smallest symphony in the United States to own its own performance hall.

The orchestra performs five subscription concerts per year.  In addition, its educational, youth and family concerts reach more than 5,000 children each year.  The orchestra also hosts the Symphony Ball, which for decades has been a leading annual social event in the Lehigh Valley.

History
The Allentown Symphony has had only three music directors throughout its history. Emmy-nominated Donald Voorhees, conductor of The Bell Telephone Hour and Cavalcade of America radio and television show orchestras, served as the music director of the Allentown Symphony for over thirty years (1951 to 1983). Under his direction, the orchestra collaborated with such notable musicians as Plácido Domingo, Phyllis Curtin, Rudolf Serkin, John Corigliano, Benny Goodman, and many others. William Smith, assistant conductor of the Philadelphia Orchestra, conducted the Symphony from 1986 to 1990. In 1995, the Allentown Symphony appointed Diane Wittry as its third music director and conductor.

Schadt string competition
Established in 1997, the Edwin H. and Leigh W. Schadt String Competition is a national solo string competition run by the Allentown Symphony Orchestra.  The competition alternates each year between violin, cello and classical guitar.  First prize is a $5,000 cash award and a solo concerto engagement with the Allentown Symphony Orchestra.  The competition is named for, and underwritten by a trust established by Edwin H. Schadt (1910–1994) and Leigh W. Schadt (1904–1996), sons of a wealthy Lehigh Valley grocery wholesaler.

Music directors
Diane Wittry (1995–present)
William Smith (1986–1990)
Donald Voorhees (1951–1983)

References

External links
Official website

1951 establishments in Pennsylvania
Culture of Allentown, Pennsylvania
Musical groups established in 1951
Orchestras based in Pennsylvania